Government-organized demonstrations or state demonstrations are demonstrations which are organized by the government of that nation.

History 
The Islamic Republic of Iran, the People's Republic of China, Republic of Cuba, Kirchnerist Argentina, the Soviet Union, Fascist Italy, and Nazi Germany among other nations, have had government-organized demonstrations.

In Iran, demonstrations such as the anniversary of Islamic revolution, are organized by government. In the past, people at these demonstrations have chanted "Down with Israel" and/or "Death to America".

The North Korean government regularly organizes demonstrations against South Korea or the United States or in support of government policies.

Modern use 
Following the North Korean example, on 16 November 2013 in the midst of the 2013-2014 mass protests against the Bulgarian Oresharski government the ruling Bulgarian Socialist Party (the successor of the Bulgarian Communist Party) organized a pro-government demonstration in support of their own governance, which had at the time the lowest-ever popularity amongst the Bulgarian population since the end of one-party rule.

A similar example happened in Poland on 13 December 2015 when Jarosław Kaczyński's party, Law and Justice, changed their annual unofficial celebrations of the anniversary of the introduction of the Martial Law into a pro-government rally  to counterbalance a 50 000 strong "prodemocratic demonstration"  organized by the Democracy Defence Committee, protesting against what they called the breaking of the constitution by Law and Justice' president Andrzej Duda and Beata Szydło's government.

During the Bolivarian Revolution, state employees in Venezuela have often been forced to participate in government-organized demonstrations or counter-demonstrations. After the arrest of Colombian businessman Alex Saab, who had close ties with the Nicolás Maduro administration and indicted with money laundering, the Venezuelan government organized a demonstration in support of Saab.

See also
 Mass games
 2017–18 Iranian protests

References

Protests
Ethically disputed political practices